Eagle Creek Township is one of eleven townships in Lake County, Indiana, United States. As of the 2010 census, its population was 1,668 and it contained 709 housing units.

History
Eagle Creek Township was established in 1839.

The Kingsbury-Doak Farmhouse was listed in the National Register of Historic Places in 2005.

Geography

Education
Eagle Creek Township, along with Cedar Creek Township and West Creek Township, is served by the Tri-Creek School Corporation which includes Lowell High School.

References

External links

Townships in Lake County, Indiana
Townships in Indiana
populated places established in 1839
1839 establishments in Indiana